Gibson Pass Ski Area, more commonly known as Manning Park Ski Area or simply Manning Park, is a small ski area located within E. C. Manning Provincial Park. The hill itself is not owned or operated by BC Parks, instead by the current park facility operator, Manning Park Resort. The land is used through a lease with the provincial government.

The hill has one tandem, single speed chairlift, one quad chairlift, a handle tow, a T-Bar, and a tube cable lift. Facilities at the hill itself include a day lodge and restaurant, guest services building, ski patrol cabin, and a daycare. The hill was originally owned and operated by Province of British Columbia.

History
The Hope-Princeton Highway was constructed in 1949, allowing easy access to the park. A small motel was constructed near the site of the current Manning Park Resort. Throughout the years, multiple different layouts and locations were tried for the ski hill, and many proposals (including a bid for the Winter Olympic games) were put forward, but ultimately the Gibson Pass location was a success. Prior to the construction of the current hill, a small ski area on the slopes between Blackwall Road and the resort existed. The first lift at the current location was a twin rope tow, which no longer exists. The original building for this lift still exists. The first chair constructed was the Blue Chair (officially Gibson Valley Chairlift No. 1) began operations in December 1967. The Orange Chair (officially Gibson Valley Chairlift No. 1), which was the primary lift until 2019, was completed in November 1970.

The resort was operated by the Provincial Government (along with other Ski Resorts in the Province) until 1986, when it and other then-provincially operated hills including Cypress Bowl and Mount Seymour transferred to private operation. A fifty year land use permit was granted for private operations. After years of mismanagement, the ski hill and resort closed indefinitely on April 1st, 2013.  Days after the closure was announced, a new operator purchased the resort and ski hill and operations resumed the following season.

The second and primary lift, the Orange Chair, was replaced in the summer 2019 as an upgrade from a two-seat design to a four-seat Doppelmayr lift

Facilities
All facilities are located at the base of the chairlifts and the top of the handle tow. There are eight buildings onsite at the ski hill, not counting lift operation buildings and disused buildings. There is no permanent lodging at the ski hill, but power hookups are available for RV's. The parking area is two-tiered and unpaved, and ploughed by Manning Park Resort. Power is supplied to the ski hill by a diesel generator located near the base of the Blue Chair. In the Summer of 2019, along with the installation of a new quad chairlift to replace the aging Orange Chair, several buildings, including the rental and snow school buildings, were demolished to make way for a new guest services building at the base of the hill.

Lifts
Manning Park resort currently has five lifts: one tandem single-speed chairlift of 1967 vintage (the  Blue Chair), one Doppelmayr fixed-grip Quad chair (new for the 2019-2020 season), one handle-tow as the upper lift in the novice area, a T-bar as the lower lift in the novice area, and a cable tow for the Polar Coaster. The novice area is split into two vertical sections. Restraining safety devices are installed on both chairlifts.

Trails

Alpine Trails

Nordic Trails

Transportation
The ski hill is located approximately ten minutes from the Manning Park Lodge off of Highway 3. A free shuttle is available every day of the week between the lodge and the ski hill. On June 1, 2018, Greyhound terminated their bus services along the Hope Princeton Highway. Partial bus service was restored to the resort, and thus the skihill, on July 13, 2019 by an unrelated operator.

See also
 East Gate, British Columbia
 Manning Provincial Park

References

Ski areas and resorts in British Columbia